The Atayal Resort is a resort in Huzhu Village, Ren'ai Township, Nantou County, Taiwan.

History
The resort was established by one of the survivor of Musha Incident. The construction of the resort started in 1987 and opened to the public in 1992.

Architecture
The theme of the 47-hectare resort is about the Atayal people. It consists of the Atayal European Style Garden, Atayal Palace and Atayal Hot and Cold Spring.

Transportation
The resort is accessible by bus or taxi from Taichung Station of the Taiwan High Speed Rail.

See also
 List of tourist attractions in Taiwan
 Wulai Atayal Museum

References

External links

 

1992 establishments in Taiwan
Atayal culture
Buildings and structures completed in 1992
Buildings and structures in Nantou County
Resorts in Taiwan
Tourist attractions in Nantou County